The technical regulator for the Internet in Chile is the Ministry of Transportation and Telecommunications, through the Undersecretariat of Telecommunications (Subtel).

The Internet country code is .cl.

Internet access

In 2011 there were 1.854 million Internet hosts in Chile. According to the International Telecommunication Union, 45% of the population in Chile had access to the Internet in 2010. The household penetration rate for fixed Internet connections stands at 39.01%, with 1,991,277   subscribers as of September 2011.

Internet usage
According to a national survey on telecommunication services consumption, published by Subtel in January 2009, 40.6% of Chileans use the Internet, while 59.1% do not.

Connection speeds

Broadband market

Market share

Plans
Companies offering home use broadband connections include:

VTR
VTR, Chile's largest cable company, offers several "always on" plans through cable modem (as of June 2020):

Flat-rate HFC plans:
200 Mbit/s (downstream)/7 Mbit/s (upstream), US$26/month (unlimited)
500/10 Mbit/s, US$32/month (unlimited)
600/16 Mbit/s, US$43/month (unlimited)

Note: Exchange rate used: 1 US dollar = 821.14 Chilean pesos (May 2020 average)

Movistar Chile
Movistar Chile, Chile's biggest phone company, offers several FTTH plans (as of June 1, 2020):

 Flat-rate FTTH plans:
200/100 Mbit/s, US$25.56
500/250 Mbit/s, US$31.65
900/450 Mbit/s, US$45.04

Note: Exchange rate used: 1 US dollar = 821.14 Chilean pesos (May 2020 average)

Entel
Entel, another major telecommunications company, offers several plans through FTTH and LTE:

 Flat-rate FTTH plans:
250/30 Mbit/s, US$26.77
500/50 Mbit/s, US$32.86
940/400 Mbit/s, US$46.26
 Wireless LTE-based connections:
10/4 Mbit/s, US$18.25
30/5 Mbit/s, US$24.34

Note: Exchange rate used: 1 US dollar = 821.14 Chilean pesos (May 2020 average)

Gtd Manquehue
Gtd Manquehue offers (through FTTH):

 Flat-rate plans:
200/100 Mbit/s, US$34.08
200/200 Mbit/s, US$35.29
400/100 Mbit/s, US$36.51
400/200 Mbit/s, US$37.71

Note: Exchange rate used: 1 US dollar = 821.14 Chilean pesos (May 2020 average)

Network neutrality
On 13 June 2010, the National Congress of Chile, amended its telecommunications law in order to preserve network neutrality, becoming the first country in the world to do so. The law, published on 26 August 2010, added three articles to the General Law of Telecommunications, forbidding ISPs from arbitrarily blocking, interfering with, discriminating, hindering or restricting an Internet user's right to use, send, receive or offer any legal content, application, service or any other type of legal activity or use through the Internet. ISPs must offer Internet access in which content is not arbitrarily treated differently based on its source or ownership.

References